CSKA Moscow 2007– 2008 season is the 2007–08 basketball season for Russian professional basketball club CSKA Moscow.

The 2007–08 season for CSKA Moscow is the 73rd official season of CSKA.
The club competing in:
2007–08 Euroleague
2007–08 Russian Basketball Super League A 
Russian Basketball Cup
Friendly matches, also CBA Euroleague Challenge.

Current captain of CSKA Moscow – Zakhar Pashutin.

Home court – CSKA Universal Sports Hall, (5,500)

Results

Results and schedules
Notes: Match-Match in season (number); League-FM:Friendly match, EL:Euroleague, SL:Super League, RC:Russian Cup, CBA:CBA Euroleague Challenge; Arena-A:Away, H:Home

Detailed Results
Times are in CET

References

CSKA Moscow
2007-08
PBC CSKA Moscow season